The 1956 World Sportscar Championship was the fourth annual FIA World Sportscar Championship.  It was a contested by sportscars over a series of five races from 29 January to 12 August 1956.

Following the major accident at the 1955 24 Hours of Le Mans that killed 80 spectators, 1955 champions Mercedes-Benz officially withdrew from motorsports and thus did not defend their title. This led to the fewest factory-backed competitors for many years.

The championship was won by Ferrari.

Championship summary

The 1956 World Sports Car Championship was ultimately contested over five races. While much of the controversy surrounding the tragedy at Le Mans had subsided by January 1956, those in the international racing community were still contending with the fallout. The organisers of the 24 Heures du Mans introduced regulations reducing the maximum engine capacity for prototype cars to 2.5 litres, which caused the race to lose championship status, but would return to the championship in 1957. Both the RAC Tourist Trophy and Carrera Panamericana were given championship status, but neither was run amid safety concerns. The RAC Tourist Trophy would never return to the Dundrod Circuit, and the Carrera Panamericana, the 1955 edition also cancelled, in spite of many attempts would never return. Returning to the championship was the 1000 km Nürburgring after being cancelled in 1955. Since championship regulations required at least five qualifying events actually be held, since Le Mans no longer qualified, and the Tourist Trophy and Carrera Panamericana cancelled, the Sveriges Grand Prix was upgraded to championship status in recognition of a successful race in 1955.

The championship remained as a contest for manufacturers, with the factory teams of Scuderia Ferrari, Maserati, Aston Martin and Jaguar leading the way. As in previous seasons, the majority of the fields were made up of amateur or gentlemen drivers, often racing against professional racing drivers with experience in Formula One.

For Ferrari's assault on the 1956 championship, they settled on using virtually identical four- and twelve-cylinder-engined machines. Both cars shared exactly the same chassis and similarly styling. Carrozzeria Scaglietti built the aluminum bodies for both. The more successful of the two was the V12-engined 290 MM, which was driven to a debut victory in the Mille Miglia by Eugenio Castellotti. In the season finale, Phil Hill and Maurice Trintignant added a second win to the 290 MM's tally in only its third major race. The sister 860 Monza had an equally impressive first outing, with a one-two victory in the Florida International Grand Prix of Endurance. During the remainder of the season, the big fours supported Ferrari's chase for the championship with valuable podium finishes. With three very convincing wins in the five rounds, Ferrari were crowned World Champions at the end of the season. For the third time in four seasons, the title had gone to Maranello.

Ferrari's chief rivals, Maserati hired Stirling Moss for the season, and prepared a works team for all the rounds of the championship. At the opening round, the 1000 km Buenos Aires, the factory efforts paid off, when all the large 4.0-litre Ferraris suffered mechanical problems, and Moss and local hero, Carlos Menditéguy took overall victory, in a 300S. For the next rounds at Sebring and the Mille Miglia, Maserati prepared the 350S. The cars were on pace but succumbed to the competition. The Internationales ADAC 1000 Kilometer Rennen auf dem Nürburgring changed this when Moss and Jean Behra took over a second car and drove it to victory. The championship ended at the Sveriges Grand Prix and Maserati had high hopes to gain enough points to win over Ferrari. Despite bringing five cars, all the Maseratis retired, leaving Ferrari to take all the top five places and the championship.

Race schedule

Points system
Championship points were awarded for the first six places in each race in the order of 8-6-4-3-2-1. 
The best result per marque at each race counted.
Only the best 3 results out of the 5 races could be retained.

Championship standings

Note:
 Points earned for race results but not counted towards the championship totals are shown within brackets in the above table.
 As the fourth and fifth placed cars at the Sveriges Grand Prix were ineligible for points, the sixth placed Jaguar was awarded points as if it had finished fourth.

The cars
The following models contributed to the net championship point scores of their respective makes.
 Ferrari 860 Monza & Ferrari 290 MM
 Maserati 300S
 Jaguar D-Type
 Aston Martin DB3S
 Porsche 550 Spyder & Porsche 550 RS
 Mercedes-Benz 300 SL

References

Further reading

 János L. Wimpffen, Time and Two Seats, 1999, pages 170–200
 The Automobile Year Book of Sports Car Racing, 1982

External links
 Championship race results & points table at wspr-racing.com
 Championship race results, programs and images at www.racingsportscars.com

 
World Sportscar Championship seasons
World